Pine Hill or Pine Hills may refer to any of the following places:

Australia 

 Pine Hill, Queensland, a locality in the Barcaldine Region, Queensland
 Pine Hills, Queensland, a locality in the Western Downs Region, Queensland

United States
Pine Hill, Alabama
Pine Hill, California
Pine Hill Ecological Reserve, California
Pine Hill (Columbus, Georgia), a neighborhood
Pine Hill (Barnstable County, Massachusetts), the highest point on Cape Cod
Pine Hills (Massachusetts), a region in Plymouth, Massachusetts 
 Pine Hill in Deer Lodge County, Montana
 Pine Hill in Wibaux County, Montana
Pine Hill, New Jersey
Pine Hill, New Mexico
Pine Hill, New York
Pine Hill (New York), an elevation in Otsego County, New York
Pine Hill (Delaware County, New York), a mountain near Unadilla
Pine Hill (Orleans County, New York), the highest elevation in Orleans County, New York
Pine Hill (Schoharie County, New York)
Pine Hill (Ashwood, Tennessee), a historic mansion

Elsewhere
Pine Hill, Saint Michael, Barbados
Pine Hill, Belize
Pine Hill, New Zealand, a suburb of Dunedin

See also
Pinehill (disambiguation)
Pine Hills (disambiguation)